Ewa Malewicka (8 May 1955 – 23 July 1995) was a Polish speed skater. She competed in four events at the 1976 Winter Olympics.

References

1955 births
1995 deaths
Polish female speed skaters
Olympic speed skaters of Poland
Speed skaters at the 1976 Winter Olympics
People from Elbląg
Sportspeople from Warmian-Masurian Voivodeship